Lars-Gunnar Pettersson (born 8 April 1960) was a Swedish professional ice hockey forward who spent all of his professional career in the Elitserien. He was drafted 174th overall into the National Hockey League by the Edmonton Oilers in the 1980 NHL Entry Draft. He has represented Sweden 5 times internationally, winning 1 gold, 1 silver and 2 bronze.

After the 1993–1994 season, he retired from ice hockey.

Career statistics

Regular season and playoffs

International

References

External links

1960 births
Edmonton Oilers draft picks
Ice hockey players at the 1988 Winter Olympics
IF Björklöven players
Living people
Luleå HF players
Medalists at the 1988 Winter Olympics
Olympic bronze medalists for Sweden
Olympic ice hockey players of Sweden
Olympic medalists in ice hockey
People from Luleå
Swedish ice hockey right wingers
Sportspeople from Norrbotten County